Waine is both a surname and a given name. Notable people with the name include:

Andy Waine (born 1983), English football player
John Waine (born 1930), Anglican bishop
Stephen Waine (born 1959), Anglican priest
Waine Bacon (born 1979), American football player
Waine Pryce (born 1981), English-born Jamaican rugby league player
Ben Waine (born 2001), New Zealand born football player

See also
Pennington v Waine, English trusts law case